Wong Poh San (born 5 December 1996 in Johor) is a Malaysian rhythmic gymnast. She won one silver and two bronze medal at the 2014 Commonwealth Games. She was part of the Malaysian team to win the bronze medal in the women's rhythmic team all-around event at the 2014 Commonwealth Games.

External links
 

1996 births
Living people
People from Johor
Malaysian rhythmic gymnasts
Gymnasts at the 2014 Commonwealth Games
Commonwealth Games silver medallists for Malaysia
Commonwealth Games bronze medallists for Malaysia
Commonwealth Games medallists in gymnastics
Medallists at the 2014 Commonwealth Games